Adrian Dan Găman is a Romanian footballer.

References

1978 births
Living people
Romanian footballers
FC UTA Arad players
FC Rapid București players
Maccabi Kiryat Gat F.C. players
Maccabi Netanya F.C. players
Bnei Yehuda Tel Aviv F.C. players
Hakoah Maccabi Amidar Ramat Gan F.C. players
BFC Siófok players
Expatriate footballers in Israel
Expatriate footballers in Hungary
Romanian expatriate sportspeople in Israel
Romanian expatriate sportspeople in Hungary
Liga I players
Association football defenders
Israeli Premier League players
Nemzeti Bajnokság I players
Romanian expatriate sportspeople in Germany